Atokad Downs was a horse racing facility in South Sioux City, Nebraska. The 5/8 mile track was built in 1956 at a cost of $250,000 and featured grandstands for 2,600 spectators and barns for 500 horses.

Atokad (Dakota spelled backwards) ran live racing continuously until 2012, when only one live race was held to keep their simulcast rights for the remainder of the year. That year, the Ho-Chunk tribe purchased the property and closed the track with future plans to open a casino on the site.

References

Defunct horse racing venues in Nebraska
Horse racing venues in Nebraska